Italian pepper may refer to:

Peperoncino
Friggitello
Peperone crusco

See also
Pepe (disambiguation)